East Ayrshire is one of thirty-two council areas of Scotland. It shares borders with Dumfries and Galloway, East Renfrewshire, North Ayrshire, South Ayrshire and South Lanarkshire. The headquarters of the council are located on London Road, Kilmarnock. With South Ayrshire and the mainland areas of North Ayrshire, it formed the former county of Ayrshire.

East Ayrshire had a population of 122,100 at the 2011 census, making it the 16th most populous local authority in Scotland. The majority of the population of East Ayrshire live within and surrounding the main town, Kilmarnock. Other large population areas in East Ayrshire include Cumnock, the second-largest town, and smaller towns and villages such as Stewarton, Darvel and Hurlford.

The largest school in Scotland, the Robert Burns Academy, is located in Cumnock.

History

East Ayrshire was created in 1996 under the Local Government etc. (Scotland) Act 1994, which replaced Scotland's previous local government structure of upper-tier regions and lower-tier districts with unitary council areas providing all local government services. East Ayrshire covered the combined area of the abolished Kilmarnock and Loudoun and Cumnock and Doon Valley districts, and also took over the functions of the abolished Strathclyde Regional Council within the area. The area's name references its location within the historic county of Ayrshire, which had been abolished for local government purposes in 1975 when Kilmarnock and Loudoun, Cumnock and Doon Valley, and Strathclyde region had been created.

In May 1975, the county council was abolished and its functions were transferred to Strathclyde Regional Council. The county area was divided between four new districts within the two-tier Strathclyde region: Cumnock and Doon Valley, Cunninghame, Kilmarnock and Loudoun and Kyle and Carrick. The Cunninghame district included the Isle of Arran, Great Cumbrae and Little Cumbrae, which had until then been administered as part of the County of Bute.

In April 1996 the two-tier system of regions and districts was abolished and Ayrshire was divided between the unitary council areas of East Ayrshire (covering the area of the former Kilmarnock & Loudoun District and Cumnock & Doon Valley District), North Ayrshire (covering the area of the former Cunninghame District Council) and South Ayrshire (covering the area of the former Kyle and Carrick District). There are many early settlements within East Ayrshire. 

The former Kilmarnock and Loudoun District Council was twinned with Sukhumi, Abkhazia. Following a review of such links in 2005, East Ayrshire continues the link as a friendship link.

There are many early settlements within East Ayrshire. The Burns Monument Centre and Dick Institute (both in Kilmarnock) are notable museums and cultural venues.

In 2017, East Ayrshire Council was named as the UK Council of the Year. In 2016, East Ayrshire Council was awarded and recognised for its recycling and resource management.

Geography

Kilmarnock is the largest town, followed by Cumnock; other towns are New Cumnock and Stewarton.

Towns and villages

Afton Bridgend
Auchinleck
Bonnyton (former village, now an area of Kilmarnock)
Catrine
Chapeltoun
Corsehill
Craigmalloch
Cronberry
Cumnock
Dalmellington
Dalrymple
Darvel
Drongan
Dunlop
Fenwick
Galston
Gatehead
Glenbuck
Greenholm
Haugh
Hurlford
Kilmarnock
Kilmaurs
Knockentiber
Lugton
Mauchline
Moscow
Muirkirk
Netherthird
New Cumnock
Newmilns
Ochiltree
Patna
Polnessan
Priestland
Rankinston
Riccarton
Sorn
Stair
Stewarton
Trabboch
Waterside

Places of interest

Aiket Castle
Auchinleck House
Dalmore House and Estate 
Loch Doon
Loudoun Castle
Kilmaurs Place
Rowallan Castle
Scottish Industrial Railway Centre
Sorn Castle
Stair House
Dean Castle
Tam O' Shanter Hone Works, Dalmore
Robertland House
Dumfries House

Economy

Historically the economy of East Ayrshire was dependent on industries such as coal mining, textiles and general manufacturing which largely fell into decline in Scotland during the 1970s and 1980s. Certain parts of East Ayrshire, particularly in the south of the region, such as Auchinleck, Bellsbank and Dalmellington have struggled to recover from the economic hardship caused by the decline and gradual closure of traditional industries, and are supported through various initiatives to try and rejuvenate their economies.

Kilmarnock has seen a gradual decline in manufacturing performance in recent years. In 2009, Diageo, owner of whisky maker Johnnie Walker (which had been founded in Kilmarnock) announced the proposed closure of the bottling plant facility in Hill Street, and in 2012, Diageo closed the facility with the loss of 700 jobs. In December 2015, Kilmarnock was awarded the title of Scotland's Most Improved Town due to efforts towards town regeneration and restoration.

Food and drink as well as local tourism provides a large sum to the economy of East Ayrshire, with visitor attractions such as Dean Castle, Palace Theatre and Dumfries House generating large means of income for the area. In rural communities of the authority, agriculture continues to be the leading sources of employment and economic productivity, particularly in the southern communities of the area. The public sector is the largest employer within the area, with the council and NHS Ayrshire and Arran being significant employers. Kilmarnock is home to the Halo Urban Generation (Kilmarnock) Ltd. company which was founded by Marie Macklin CBE, with a focus on providing opportunities for new businesses within the area, and with an estimated Gross Domestic Product (GDP) revenue of £205 million to the Scottish economy, it supports 1,500 jobs within the area.

Education
 
 
East Ayrshire has nine secondary schools, forty-three primary schools, four schools which cater for children with additional support needs, thirty-three early education childhood centres and three children's houses. 

Kilmarnock Academy is one of only two schools in the world to have educated two Nobel laureates: Alexander Fleming and John Boyd Orr. Both men attended Kilmarnock Academy when it was located on North Hamilton Street; the school has since relocated to Sutherland Drive.

The area's secondary schools include:

Doon Academy
Grange Academy
Kilmarnock Academy 
Loudoun Academy
Robert Burns Academy
St Joseph's Academy
Stewarton Academy

Kilmarnock is home to a campus of Ayrshire College, which provides a range of courses to adults as well as school-aged pupils. It is funded by East Ayrshire council and other educational providers. The campus opened in October 2016 in a new, £53 million, building on the site of the Johnnie Walker bottling plant. It superseded the Kilmarnock College building on Holehouse Road.

Governance

The council has been under no overall control since 2007, with the Scottish National Party leading a variety of minority administrations since then. The next election is due in 2027. The council's civic head takes the title of provost. This is a largely ceremonial role, chairing council meetings and acting as the area's first citizen. Although an elected councillor, the provost is expected to be politically impartial. Political leadership is provided by the leader of the council, who has been Douglas Reid of the SNP since 2007.

The council's chief executive is Eddie Fraser, who took on the role in January 2021.

Political control
The first election to East Ayrshire Council was held in 1995, initially operating as a shadow authority alongside the outgoing authorities until the new system came into force on 1 April 1996. Political control of the council since 1996 has been as follows:

Leadership
The leaders of the council since 1996 have been:

Elections
Since 2007 elections have been held every five years under the single transferable vote system, introduced by the Local Governance (Scotland) Act 2004. Election results since 1995 have been as follows:

Premises
The council's main offices are at Council Headquarters on London Road, Kilmarnock. The building was built as the James Hamilton School, which was designed by William Reid, the Ayrshire county architect, and opened in 1933. The school relocated to a new site in 1977 and the buildings became the London Road Centre and were used for various purposes until they were converted to offices for East Ayrshire Council ahead of the new council's creation in 1996.

Wards

Since 2017 the area has divided into nine multi-member wards returning 32 members:

Annick (4 seats)
Kilmarnock North (3 seats)
Kilmarnock West and Crosshouse (4 seats)
Kilmarnock East and Hurlford (4 seats)
Kilmarnock South (3 seats)
Irvine Valley (3 seats)
Ballochmyle (4 seats)
Cumnock and New Cumnock (4 seats)
Doon Valley (3 seats)

Wider politics

UK Parliament

Scottish Parliament

Constituency MSPs

Regional List MSPs

References

External links 
East Ayrshire Council

 
Council areas of Scotland